Peter Kassovitz (born  7 January 1938) is a Hungarian-French film director and scriptwriter.

Personal life

He was born to Jewish parents in Budapest, Hungary. He fled the country at the time of the Hungarian Revolution of 1956. He is the father of French film director Mathieu Kassovitz.

Filmography

References

External links 
 

1938 births
Living people
French film directors
Hungarian Jews
Hungarian emigrants to France